The 1920 Revolution Brigades (Arabic كتائب ثورة العشرين Kitā'ib Thawrat al-ʿIshrīn) is a Sunni militia group in Iraq, which includes former members of the disbanded Iraqi army. The group has used improvised explosive devices, and armed attacks against U.S./Coalition forces. The group comprises the military wing of the Islamic Resistance Movement. The group is named in reference to the Iraqi revolt of 1920.

Allegiances
A US military spokesman states that the "concerned local nationals" group is now aligned with U.S. forces, while the Brigades denied this in a posting on its web site: "We say to … the occupation and to your followers and agents that you made a very big lie" in linking the group with the Diyala anti-al Qaida campaign. The group maintains that the "Iraqi Hamas" organization, which consisted of members who left the Brigades before the Diyala operation, were the ones involved in the operation. Iraqi Prime Minister Nuri al-Maliki has feared such US-armed 'concerned local citizens' are an armed Sunni opposition in the making, and has argued that such groups should be under the command of the Iraqi Army or police.

Activities
The 1920 Revolution Brigades describes its aim as to establish a liberated and independent Iraqi state on an Islamic basis. It has been active in the area west of Baghdad, in the regions of Abu Ghraib, Khan Dari and Fallujah and in the governorates of Ninwi, Diyali and al-Anbar. The name of the group (Literally "Brigades of the Revolution of the Twenty") refers to the Iraqi revolt of 1920 against the British, drawing an implicit parallel between the nationalist movement against Britain with the Iraqi guerrillas fighting against coalition forces in the 21st century. They are the military wing of the Islamic Resistance Movement. The logo of the group is a map of Iraq, with a Quran on top of it, and the verse "Fight them, God shall torture them by your hands". In the middle there is a mirrored symbol of an AK-47, with an Iraqi flag attached to it. Between the gun and the flag, a small print says "Islamic Resistance movement", and below, a larger print reads "Brigades of the 20th Revolution."

History

The Brigade first emerged in a 16 July statement in which it claimed that U.S. forces were sustaining higher casualties than were being reported. Since then, it resurfaced periodically, including in graffiti in such insurgent strongholds as Fallujah. This group appears to concentrate on guerilla activity, rather than terrorism, and is sensitive to the opinions of the established Sunni Muslim clergy in Iraq (in contrast to groups such as Al-Tawhid Wal-Jihad). High-profile operations include the kidnapping of American citizen Dean Sadek in November 2004 (he appeared in two hostage videos but was never found) and the bombing of the al-Arabiya television network headquarters in Baghdad in October 2005. It has also shot down several American helicopters in the Fallujah region.

Little is known about the group's leadership. On 2 January 2005, the Ministry of Defence (Iraq) reported that Iraqi security forces arrested Hatim al-Zawba'i, whom they identified as a commander of the 1920 Revolution Brigades. In a statement issued on 13 February 2006, the group vowed to "carry on jihad until the liberation and victory or [until they are] martyred.

Organization split
On March 2007 some of its members broke off from the 1920 Revolution Brigades to form Hamas of Iraq.

In a statement issued on 18 March 2007, the 1920 Revolution Brigades stated that it had dissolved into two new brigades, Islamic Conquest and Islamic Jihad. Islamic Conquest became Hamas of Iraq and is the name chosen for its military wing. Islamic Jihad took over the name Twentieth Revolution Brigades, promising to uphold its jihadi inheritance.

Relationships with others
The 1920 Revolution Brigade has used bombings, kidnappings, and armed attacks against U.S. forces but does not target non-Muslims or Shiites, staying out of the sectarian war. As a result, it has developed a growing rift with The Jihad Base Organization in Mesopotamia, which has used suicide bombings to often target Shiites which they regard as infidels. The 1920 Revolution Brigade turned down an offer to pledge allegiance to an insurgent coalition group, the Islamic State in Iraq (ISI), established by the Jihad Base Organization in Mesopotamia.

On 27 March 2007, the leader of the 1920 Revolution Brigade, Harith Dhahir Khamis al-Dari (nephew of the most prominent Sunni Iraqi cleric, Haith al-Dari) was killed in an ISI ambush. Intermittent gunbattles have taken place between fighters of the 1920 Revolution Brigades and the Islamic State in Iraq, and rumors have circulated of negotiations between members of the group and the Iraqi government and U.S. forces.

Although the group has used bombings, kidnappings, and armed attacks against U.S. forces, on 20 June 2007, The Washington Post reported that, per telephone interview with Lt. Col. Joseph Davidson, executive officer of the 2nd Infantry Division, U.S. forces were now "partnering with Sunni insurgents from the 1920 Revolution Brigades, which includes former members of ousted president Saddam Hussein's disbanded army." The group has since replied that: "We say to … the occupation and to your followers and agents that you made a very big lie" in linking us with the Diyala anti-al Qaida campaign. The group maintains that the organization to which the US military spokesman referred had become the "Iraqi Hamas" organization, which consisted of members who left before the Diyala operation and were no longer associated with the 1920 Brigades.

In October 2007, The Guardian reported that the 1920 Revolution Brigades would not join an alliance of six other Iraqi insurgent groups. The six groups listed a 14-point political program, including a call for continued action against US forces and a declaration that all laws passed by the Iraq government were null and void. A spokesman for the brigades said it did not join because it did not want to fight with those Sunni tribal groups working with the US against al-Qaida. The spokesman also denied an Economist report that the 1920 Revolution Brigades was working with Americans, and insisted the group was still attacking Americans.

See also
 List of armed groups in the Iraqi Civil War

External links
 October 2007: Statement from the 1920 Revolution Brigades
 Anti-US Iraqi Resistance Regrouping
 Official Website

References

Arab militant groups
Factions in the Iraq War
Islamist insurgent groups
Paramilitary organizations based in Iraq
Organizations established in 2003
Iraqi insurgency (2003–2011)
Iraqi nationalism
Islamic organizations based in Iraq
Terrorism in Iraq
2003 establishments in Iraq
Resistance movements